Wang Yang (born 26 July 1989 in Wuhan) is a Chinese footballer who currently plays for Hebei China Fortune in the Chinese Super League.

Club career

Wang Yang started his career with Wuhan Optics Valley's youth academy. After the team disbanded at the end of the 2008 season, Wang had a trial with Belgian Pro League side Cercle Brugge in December 2008 along with his fellow countryman Mei Fang. The Cercle Brugge board later decided to offer a contract to Wang. He signed with them until June 2010 and extended his contract until the end of the 2011–12 season. Wang concluded the 2008–09 season with Cercle Brugge's reserves team. Wang was promoted to the club's first team for the 2009–10 season. In the first match of the 2009–10 season, Wang made his debut for Cercle Brugge as an 84th-minute substitute for Vuza Nyoni in a 3–1 loss against AA Gent. He was released by Cercle Brugge after the 2011–12 season.

Wang then signed for Chinese Super League side Wuhan Zall on 3 July 2013. He made his debut for the club on 20 October 2013 in a 1–0  loss against Shanghai East Asia. He was released at the end of the 2013 season after failing to make his mark as the club was relegated to the second tier.

On 24 July 2014, Wang transferred to China League One side Hebei Zhongji. He made his debut for the club on 26 July 2014 in a 3–1 win against Guangdong Sunray Cave.

References

External links
 Wang Yang player info at the official Cercle Brugge site 
 Wang Yang player info at Sporza.be 

1989 births
Living people
Footballers from Wuhan
Association football wingers
Association football forwards
Chinese footballers
Wuhan Guanggu players
Wuhan F.C. players
Hebei F.C. players
Chinese Super League players
China League One players
Cercle Brugge K.S.V. players
Belgian Pro League players
Chinese expatriate footballers
Chinese expatriate sportspeople in Belgium
Expatriate footballers in Belgium